Chetogaster is a genus of bristle flies in the family Tachinidae.

Species 
Chetogaster argentifera Malloch, 1936
Chetogaster auriceps Paramonov, 1968
Chetogaster canberrae Paramonov, 1954
Chetogaster oblonga (Macquart, 1847)
Chetogaster violacea Macquart, 1851
Chetogaster viridis Malloch, 1936

References 

Diptera of Australasia
Tachinidae genera
Dexiinae
Taxa named by Pierre-Justin-Marie Macquart